Larry Adams (June 13, 1936 – February 27, 2000) was an American jockey who was active from 1960 until 1983. He rode in the Kentucky Derby five times, achieving third place riding High Echelon on May 2, 1970. His greatest successes came in 1965-1966 when he was the favored mount for a horse named Moccasin. From August 6 until November 6, 1965, Moccasin, trained by Harry Trotsek, had a streak of eight wins in a row while ridden by Adams. In 1974, at the age of 38, Adams was denied a jockey's license by the New York State Racing and Wagering Board. His license request was rejected due to his failure to mention  on his license application that he had two prior arrests. He was reinstated as a licensed jockey after a lengthy suspension.

References 

1936 births
2000 deaths
American jockeys